The Bureau of Magical Things is an Australian drama television series created by Jonathan M. Shiff and developed by Jonathan M. Shiff and Mark Shirrefs that premiered in Australia on Eleven on 8 July 2018, and aired through 2 November 2018. In the United States, the series debuted on Nickelodeon on 8 October 2018; it later moved to TeenNick where it was broadcast from 15 October to 8 November 2018. The series stars Kimie Tsukakoshi, Elizabeth Cullen, Mia Milnes, Julian Cullen, Rainbow Wedell, Jamie Carter, and Christopher Sommers. The Bureau of Magical Things was renewed for a second season in November 2019, which premiered on 10 July 2021 on 10 Shake, and aired through 8 August 2021.

Premise
The human and magic worlds co-existed in harmony, but as technology advanced, the magic world was pushed back, and fairies and other magical creatures became endangered species. Now, someone wants to change that and restore magic to its rightful place. When Kyra uncovers a threat to both the human and magic worlds, she must try to unite humans, elves, and fairies in order to save them all. Kyra and Peter must solve the mystery of who the enigmatic figure is and how they will achieve their goal. The investigation leads them to uncover secrets in both the human and magic worlds that no one could have imagined.

Cast and characters

Main
 Kimie Tsukakoshi as Kyra, a teenage girl whose life is changed after an encounter with a magic book is thought to have transformed her into a "triling": part human, part fairy and part elf. While wary of her new circumstances, she is learning to accept her new reality.
 Elizabeth Cullen as Imogen, an elf training to become a member of the Department of Magical Intervention (DMI). Although serious about her training, she does not believe in teamwork. At first quite wary of Kyra, she begins to soften to her. 
 Mia Milnes as Lily, a fairy training to become a member of the DMI. She is friendly, with a bubbly personality, and quickly warms to Kyra. 
 Julian Cullen as Darra, Imogen's brother, an elf training to become a member of the DMI. Compared to his sister, he is more friendly and less serious about his studies.
 Rainbow Wedell as Ruksy, a fairy training to become a member of the DMI. Like Lily, she is friendly, but she is also much more serious.
 Jamie Carter as Peter, Kyra's friend. He loves comics and is very suspicious of the magical phenomena that occur around him.
 Christopher Sommers as Professor Maxwell, a bookstore owner and teacher of magic for the DMI. He is a halfling: half human and half elf. He cares greatly for his students and wants them to reach their full magical potential.

Recurring
 Arnijka Larcombe-Weate as Mathilda, Kyra's best friend and fellow basketball player who doesn't know of Kyra's magical powers.
 Steve Nation as Steve, Kyra's stepfather and a local police officer who is also unaware of Kyra's powers.
 Melanie Zanetti as Orla (season 1), an elf who's one of the DMI's top agents and Imogen's idol who poses as a reporter. She is an old acquaintance of Maxwell's and apparently has her own agenda involving Kyra.
 Nicholas Bell as Sean, Lily's father and the Director of Magic.
 Miah Madden as Tayla (season 2), a mysterious fairy who is a new student at River City High School and works at the Gangway café.
 Matthew Manahan as Ben (season 2), a musician whom Lily has a crush on.
 Tasneem Roc as Dr Apinya Surinat (season 2), an old associate of Professor Maxwell's who takes his place when he is forced to step aside. The trainees, especially Kyra, soon find reason to be suspicious of her.

Production
On 17 July 2017, it was announced that a new children's series was to film in Queensland from  producer Jonathan M. Shiff (H2O: Just Add Water, Mako: Island of Secrets, Thunderstone, Ocean Girl, Horace and Tina). The 20-episode series is set to film specifically in Gold Coast, Brisbane, and Arundel, with filming starting in July 2017 and ending in December 2017. Starring in the series will be Kimie Tsukakoshi, Elizabeth Cullen, Julian Cullen, Mia Milnes, Rainbow Wedell, Jamie Carter, Nicholas Bell, Christopher Sommers, Steve Nation, and Melanie Zanetti. Jonathan M. Shiff serves as executive producer and producer. Julia Adams serves as executive producer. Stuart Wood serves as producer. Mark Shirrefs serves as writer. Evan Clarry and Grant Brown serve as directors. The series aired in Australia on Eleven. On 22 September 2018, Nickelodeon acquired the rights to the series and announced that the series would premiere in the United States on 8 October 2018.

On 27 November 2019, it was announced that a second season of the series would be produced, with production to take place between December 2019 and July 2020 in Gold Coast, Queensland, Australia. The series cast, including Kimie Tsukakoshi, was expected to return. However, production on the series was shut down due to the COVID-19 pandemic.

Episodes
</onlyinclude>

Series 1 (2018)

Series 2 (2021)

U.S. ratings 
 

| link2             = #Episodes
| episodes2         = 20
| start2            = 
| end2              = 
| startrating2      = 
| endrating2        = 
| viewers2          =

}}

Awards and nominations

|-
!scope="row"|2022
|Screen Music Awards
|Best Music for Children’s Programming
|Brett Aplin
|
|

References

External links
 U.S. website
 ZDFE enterprises – Production website
 

2010s Australian comedy television series
2018 Australian television series debuts
2020s Australian comedy television series
2021 Australian television series endings
10 Peach original programming
10 Shake original programming
Australian children's television series
English-language television shows
Netflix children's programming
ZDF original programming
Television shows set in Gold Coast, Queensland
Television shows set in Brisbane